Shemyakinsky is a rural locality (a khutor) in Rossoshinskoye Rural Settlement, Uryupinsky District, Volgograd Oblast, Russia. The population was 154 as of 2010. There are 4 streets.

Geography 
Shemyakinsky is located 39 km southeast of Uryupinsk (the district's administrative centre) by road. Verkhnesoinsky is the nearest rural locality.

References 

Rural localities in Uryupinsky District